Dieter Gilberto Hillert is a German-American biolinguist and cognitive scientist. His research focuses on the human language faculty as a cognitive and neurological system. He is known for work on the neurobiology of language, real-time sentence processing, and language evolution. He advocates comparative evolutionary studies of cognition, argues against tabula rasa models, and favors computational theories of mind.

Biography 
Hillert was born in Wiesbaden-Sonnenberg (West Germany) in 1956, as second son of Guido Joachim Hillert, an aerospace and civil engineer, and his wife Charlotte Hillert, née Holland-Cunz. He spent his youth in Wiesbaden and attended Johannes Gutenberg University Mainz and Goethe University Frankfurt am Main. He was clinically trained in neurolinguistics at the medical school of the RWTH Aachen, Germany. Hillert received his degrees up to the Ph.D. and Habilitation (Priv.-Doz.) from the Goethe University Frankfurt am Main. His academic career started as a post-doc for neurolinguistics in France at the Centre Paul Broca in Paris, in the United States at Boston University and MIT, in Canada at the Université du Québec à Montréal. He was then appointed as a lecturer at the University of Manchester  in England, and continued his academic career at the University of California, San Diego in the United States. At present, he is an adjunct professor at San Diego State University. Occasionally, he lectures in Japan, inter alia, at the Kyoto University and the University of Tokyo. He contributes to the science of language by publishing theoretical and experimental research on various language-related themes such as sentence processing, figurative language, semantics and syntax, bilingualism, aphasia, and language evolution.

He received several awards from the Alexander von Humboldt Foundation and the Japan Society for the Promotion of Science.

Books and Volumes
Hillert, D. (Ed. 2017). Language Evolution. On the Origin of Lexical and Syntactic Structures. Journal of Neurolinguistics 43 (B), p. 75-274. https://www.sciencedirect.com/journal/journal-of-neurolinguistics/vol/43/part/https
Hillert, D. (2017). Die Natur der Sprache. Evolution, Paradigmen & Schaltkreise. Heidelberg: Springer. 
Hillert, D. (2014). The Nature of Language. Evolution, Paradigms & Circuits. New York: Springer. 
Hillert, D. (Ed. 1998). Sentence Processing: A Cross-linguistic Perspective. Syntax and Semantics 31. San Diego: Academic Press. 
Hillert, D. (Ed. 1994). Linguistics and Cognitive Neuroscience: Theoretical and Empirical Studies on Language Disorders. Linguistische Berichte 6. 
Hillert, D. (1990). Sprachprozesse und Wissensstrukturen. Wiesbaden: Westdeutscher Verlag. 
Hillert, D. (1987). Zur mentalen Repräsentation von Wortbedeutungen. Tübinger Beiträge Linguistik 290. Tübingen: Gunter Narr Verlag.

Selected Articles and Essays
Hillert, D. (2021). How did language evolve in the lineage of higher primates? Lingua 264, 103158. https://doi.org/10.1016/j.lingua.2021.103158
Hillert, D. (2019). Neurobiology of Language. In K. Shackelford and V.A. Weekes-Shackelford (Eds.) Encyclopedia of Evolutionary Psychological Science. Cham: Springer. http://doi.org/10.1007/978-3-319-16999-6_3334-2
Hillert D.G. (2017). Nimm’s nicht so wörtlich. In: S. Ayan (Ed.) Rätsel Mensch - Expeditionen im Grenzbereich von Philosophie und Hirnforschung. Heidelberg: Springer. 
Hillert, D.G. (2012). Figuras retóricas: un reto para el cerebro. Edición española de Scientific American: Mente y Cerebro Nº 55, 38-42. ISSN 1695-0887
Hillert, D. (2015). On the Evolving Biology of Language. Frontiers in Psychology 6, 1796. https://doi.org/10.3389/fpsyg.2015.01796
Hillert, D.G. & Buracas, G.T. (2009). The Neural Substrates of Spoken Idiom Comprehension. Language and Cognitive Processes 24 (9), 1370-1391. http://doi.org/10.1080/01690960903057006
Hillert, D.G. (2008). On Idioms: Cornerstones of a Neurological Model of Language Processing. Journal of Cognitive Science 9(2), 193-233. http://hdl.handle.net/10371/7090
Hillert, D. & Ackerman, F. (2002). Accessing and Parsing Phrasal Predicates. In N. Dehé, R. Jackendoff, A. McIntryre, and S. Urban (Eds.) Verb-Particle Explorations. Berlin, New York: Mouton de Gruyter, p. 289-313. http://doi.org/10.1515/9783110902341
Hillert, D. & Swinney, D. (2001). The Processing of Fixed Expressions during Sentence Comprehension. In A. Cienki, B.J. Luka, and M.B. Smith (Eds.) Conceptual Structure, Discourse, and Language. Stanford: CSLI, p. 107-121. 
Hillert, D. (2001). On Processing Lexical Concepts in Aphasia and Alzheimer’s disease. Some (Re)considerations. Brain and Language 69, 95-118. https://doi.org/10.1006/brln.1999.2053
Hillert, D. (1992). Semantics and Aphasia: A State-of-the-Art review. Journal of Neurolinguistics 7 (1), 1-43. https://doi.org/10.1016/0911-6044(92)90010-T

External links

Living people
Goethe University Frankfurt
German psychologists
University of California, San Diego faculty
San Diego State University faculty
Year of birth missing (living people)
RWTH Aachen University alumni